The 22471 / 22472 Bikaner–Delhi Sarai Rohilla Intercity Express is a Superfast Express train belonging to Indian Railways – North Western Railway zone that runs between  and  in India.

It operates as train number 22471 from Bikaner Junction to Delhi Sarai Rohilla and as train number 22472 in the reverse direction, serving the states of Rajasthan, Haryana and Delhi.

Coaches

22471/22472 Bikaner–Delhi Sarai Rohilla Intercity Express has 1 AC 2 tier, 5 AC 3 tier, 8 Sleeper class, 6 General Unreserved & 2 SLR (Seating cum Luggage Rake) coaches. It does not carry a pantry car.

As is customary with most train services in India, coach composition may be amended at the discretion of Indian Railways depending on demand.

Service

As the average speed of the train is above , as per Indian Railways rules, its fare includes a Superfast surcharge.

Routeing

Traction

As large sections of the route are yet to be fully electrified, a Bhagat Ki Kothi-based WDP-4 / WDP-4B / WDP-4D locomotive powers the train for its entire journey.

Rake sharing
The train shares its rake with 12981/12982 Chetak Express.

See also 

 Delhi Sarai Rohilla railway station
 Bikaner Junction railway station
 Delhi Sarai Rohilla–Bikaner Express (via Sri Ganganagar)
 Delhi Sarai Rohilla–Bikaner Superfast Express

References

External links

Transport in Bikaner
Transport in Delhi
Rail transport in Rajasthan
Rail transport in Haryana
Rail transport in Delhi
Intercity Express (Indian Railways) trains
Railway services introduced in 2011